The 2021–22 Women's Basketball Super League is the 42nd edition of the top-tier level professional women's basketball league in Turkey.

Teams 
Adana Basketbol and Canik Belediyespor finished the 2020–21 regular season in the last two places and were relegated to the Second League (TKBL). In May 2021, Bursa Büyükşehir Belediyespor as the regular season champion and Antalya 07 Basketbol as the play-off winner, were promoted to the Super League.

Regular season

League table

Positions by round

Results 
<div style="overflow:auto">

Playoffs

See also
 2022 Turkish Cup

References

External links
Official Site

Turkish Women's Basketball League seasons
Women
Turkey